Barca is a borough (city ward) of Košice, Slovakia. The borough is generally rural in nature.

History 
It was originally a village in its own right, the first written record about Barca dating back to 1215.

In the latter half of the 20th century, Barca lost village municipality status and was annexed to Košice as one of its boroughs.

One of the principal features within contemporary Barca's catastral territory is Košice International Airport, which is the second largest in Slovakia.

Evolution of the borough's name

Some of the historical names of Barca.

 1215 - villa Barca (Latin)
 1230 - Barca
 1269 - Barcha
 1291 - Barchakuzep
 1297 - villa Barcha
 1299 - Barcha
 1570 - Bárczá (Hungarian)
 1773 - Barca (Slovak)

Historical landmarks 

In the medieval period, the village included a small castle of local noblemen, later demolished and replaced by a manor house of the Bárczay noble family. The manor house stands to this day and has undergone restoration works during the 2010s.

Barca has several more former manor houses, specifically the manor house of the Zichy family and the Berzeviczi family  manor house.

The main churches of the borough are the Roman Catholic Church of St Peter and St Paul and the local Reformed church.

Statistics

 Area: 
 Population: 3,626 (31 December 2017) 
 Density of population: 200/km² (31 December 2017) 
 District: Košice IV
 Mayor: František Krištof (as of 2018 elections)

Gallery

References

External links

 Official website of the Košice-Barca borough
 Article on the Košice-Barca borough at Cassovia.sk (in Slovak only)
 Official website of the town of Košice
 Barca's manor house (on the site of a former castle)

Boroughs of Košice
Villages in Slovakia merged with towns